American actor, director, and producer Kevin Costner started his acting career in 1981 by starring in the romantic comedy independent film Sizzle Beach, U.S.A. He went on to appear in the films Testament (1983), and Shadows Run Black (1984) before co-starring in the 1985 ensemble western film Silverado alongside Kevin Kline, Scott Glenn, and Danny Glover. The same year, he starred in the comedy film Fandango with Judd Nelson. In 1987, Costner starred as Eliot Ness in the crime film The Untouchables with Robert De Niro and Sean Connery. The following year, he starred as Crash Davis in the romantic comedy sports film Bull Durham with Susan Sarandon and Tim Robbins. The film is on AFI's 10 Top 10 for Greatest Sports Movies. Costner then starred in the sports fantasy drama film Field of Dreams with James Earl Jones. The film received generally positive reviews from critics, and was nominated for three Academy Awards: Best Picture, Best Original Score and Best Adapted Screenplay. In 2017, it was selected for preservation in the United States National Film Registry by the Library of Congress as "culturally, historically, or aesthetically significant". It's also on AFI's 10 Top 10 for Greatest Fantasy Movies.

In the 1990's, Costner starred in numerous films including the 1990 epic Western film Dances with Wolves as Lieutenant John J. Dunbar, which he also directed and produced. The film received 12 Academy Awards nominations with Costner winning Best Picture, Best Director and was nominated for Best Actor. He also starred as Robin Hood in Robin Hood: Prince of Thieves with Morgan Freeman (1991), The Bodyguard with Whitney Houston (1992), Wyatt Earp with Dennis Quaid (1994), Tin Cup with Rene Russo (1996), The Postman with Will Patton (1997), Message in a Bottle with Robin Wright (1999) and For Love of the Game with Kelly Preston (also 1999). In the 2000's, he co-starred in the heist black action comedy film 3000 Miles to Graceland with Kurt Russell (2001), the Revisionist Western film Open Range with Robert Duvall (2003), Rob Reiner's romantic comedy film Rumor Has It with Jennifer Aniston (2005), psychological thriller film Mr. Brooks with Demi Moore (2007), and the comedy-drama film Swing Vote with Kelsey Grammer (2008).

He was cast as Jonathan Kent in Zack Snyder's 2013 superhero film Man of Steel, based on the DC Comics character Superman. In 2014, he co-starred in the films Jack Ryan: Shadow Recruit with Chris Pine, 3 Days to Kill with Amber Heard, and Draft Day with Jennifer Garner. For his role in the 2016 biographical drama film Hidden Figures, Costner and the cast won the Screen Actors Guild Award for Outstanding Performance by a Cast in a Motion Picture. He played Jessica Chastain's father in the 2017 biographical crime drama film Molly's Game and he portrayed lawman and Texas Ranger Frank Hamer in the 2019 period crime thriller film The Highwaymen opposite Woody Harrelson.

Costner's television work includes playing Devil Anse Hatfield in the three-part Western television miniseries Hatfields & McCoys, and since 2018, he has played John Dutton on the neo-Western drama series Yellowstone.

Film

Television

Producer

References

External links 
 

Male actor filmographies
Director filmographies
American filmographies